The President of the Council of State of Nicaragua was the presiding officer of Nicaragua's interim legislature.

Sources
Carlos Nunez Tellez - Sandinista Leader, 39 - New York Times

Politics of Nicaragua
Legislative speakers
20th century in Nicaragua